Hot pursuit is a legal term.

Hot Pursuit may also refer to:

Film and television 
Hot Pursuit (1984 TV series), an NBC television series
Hot Pursuit (2006 TV series), a Court TV television series
Hot Pursuit (1987 film), an American action comedy film starring John Cusack
Hot Pursuit (2015 film), an American comedy film starring Reese Witherspoon and Sofía Vergara

Video games 
Need for Speed III: Hot Pursuit, a racing video game, by EA Canada, released in 1998
Need for Speed: Hot Pursuit 2, the sequel, by EA Black Box, released in 2002
Need for Speed: Hot Pursuit, by Criterion Games, released in 2010

Comics 
Hot Pursuit, a DC Comics character who is a future version of Barry Allen (Flash)

See also

 
 
 Need for Speed: Hot Pursuit (disambiguation)
 Pursuit (disambiguation)
 Hot (disambiguation)